X Factor is a Romanian television music competition that aims to find a new music talent to become a star. The third season began airing on 23 September 2013 on Antena 1. The winner will receive a prize of €120,000 (decreased from €200,000 last season).

This season has the slogan "Muzică și suflet" ("Music and soul").

The hosts are the same as in the first and second season: Răzvan Simion and Dani Oțil, who are also known for hosting a well-known morning show on Antena 1. Dan Bittman, Delia Matache and Cheloo have returned as judges for the third season.

The registration started for the third season in June 2013. Antena 1 made changes on the list for the audition cities: Craiova was dropped, Arad and Bucharest were added.

On December 22, 2013, the season was won by Florin Ristei, mentored by Matache. Alex Mațaev, mentored also by Matache finished in second place.

Judges

Delia Matache – singer
Dan Bittman – singer, television host
Cheloo – rapper

Selection process

Auditions

Audition process was based on the British and American version. First up were "The Producer's Audition", where the producers chose singers to proceed to the second phase which was "The Audition before the Judging panel". The first auditions took place at Craiova, on 2 June.  They then took place in Arad, on June 5 in Cluj Napoca on June 8, 2013, on June 11 in Iași, on June 14 in Constanța and concluded on June 17, 2013 in Bucharest.

Bootcamp
In a change to the usual format, the judges were allocated their categories before bootcamp. Cheloo will mentor the Groups, Matache took the Over 20s and Bittman had the Under 20s. The group Bruiaj (Eliza Bunu and Rareş Raicu) was formed in bootcamp. After the bootcamp period, there were 32 acts left.

The 32 acts who reached the Judges' Houses:
Under 20s: Ana-Maria Mihăieș, Andrei Ciobanu, Alexandru Simion, Bogdan Bratiș, Florena Țicu Șandro, Rodica Tudor, Mihai Tăbăcaru, Claudiu Nergheș, Andrei Raețchi, Alexandru Ionașc, Andreea Lazăr, Ruxandra Tomulesei and Mădălina Lefter
Groups:  Bruiaj, Cat Girls, Chillout, Căminu' 16, Double X, Fără Titlu, November and Quattro 
Over 20s: Alex Mațaev, Diana Vartolomei, Dumitru Botnaru, Florin Ristei, Maria Roșculete, Larisa Vâna, Eliza Nirlu, Mihai Tăbăcaru, Miruna Diaconescu, Isabella Covrig, Paolo Lagana and Oana Muntean

Judges house
The judges' home visit was the last stage of the selection process. The episode were aired on 17 November 2013. Each judge took the remaining members of their category to an overseas location, and had guests to assist them in their decisions. Cheloo was assisted by Mihaela Rădulescu, Delia was advised by Mihai Bendeac and Bittman was by Simona Gherghe. In this stage Bella from November was eliminated by her mentor and the group November remained with only two members.

The seventeen eliminated acts were:
Under 20s: Andrei Ciobanu, Alexandru Simion, Rodica Tudor, Mihai Tăbăcaru, Andrei Raețchi, Alexandru Ionașc, Andreea Lazăr 
Groups:  Chillout, Fără Titlu, Cat Girls
Over 20s: Diana Vartolomei, Maria Roșculete, Larisa Vâna, Eliza Nirlu, Claudiu Nergheș, Miruna Diaconescu, Isabella Covrig

Finalists

The 15 finalists were confirmed as follows:

Key:
 – Winner
 – Runner-up
 – Third place

Results summary
Color key

Live Shows
The live shows underwent a change in this season. In the first three live shows, each category will have its own final showdown, the result of which is decided solely by its mentor. The outcome of the fourth show will only rely on the public vote and will have two eliminations (one of which will happen halfway through of the show, when the voting will have been frozen). Thus, the final will have four contestants (not three as in previous seasons). Two of the finalists will be eliminated halfway through the final show, when the voting will have been frozen. The winner is still determined by the public vote.

Week 1 (24 November)
Theme: Hits from last 20 years
Group performance(s): Medley from "U Can't Touch This", "Gonna Make You Sweat, "MMMBop", "Wannabe", "Hung Up", "Blurred Lines", "I Gotta Feeling"
Musical Guest: Paraziții ("Din colțul blocului", "Toate-s la fel", "Arde")

Judges' votes to eliminate
 Matache: Dumitru Botnaru - gave no reason
 Bittman: Ruxandra Tomulesei - based on the performances
 Cheloo: Quattro - gave no reason

Week 2 (29 November)
Theme: Romanian music
Group performance(s):  Medley - Romanian music: "Inima mea", "O secundă", "Amintirile", "Poezie de stradă", "Rămâi cu mine", "Dragostea din tei", "P.O.H.U.I", "Ți-am dat un inel".
Musical Guest:  Holograf ("Roua dimineții", "Cât de departe", "Dacă noi ne iubim")

Judges' votes to eliminate
 Matache: Paolo Lagana - praised his attitude, but went with Oana for her voice
 Bittman: Ana-Maria Mihăieș - gave no reason
 Cheloo: Căminu' 16 - said he trusted in the other group's abilities

Week 3 (8 December)
Theme: Best voices (Hits) 
Group performance(s): Medley from "Wake Me Up", "Call Me Maybe", "Feel This Moment" 
Musical Guest: Delia Matache ("Doar pentru tine", "Doi în unu", "Vino la mine"), Cocoon Kills and Andreea Lazăr ("Pisi cea obraznică"), Petra Pintelei ("Sleeping Sun"), Tudor Turcu ("Nu minţi")

Judges' votes to eliminate
 Matache: Oana Muntean - based on performance
 Bittman: Florena Țicu Șandro - based on performance
 Cheloo: Bruiaj - gave no reason

Week 4: Semi-final (15 December)
Theme: Celebrity Duets
Group performance(s): Medley from "Wild Ones", "When Love Takes Over", "Moves like Jagger"
Musical Guest: Dragoş Udilă feat. What's Up ("Scumpă domnişoară"), CRBL ("KBoom"), Lora ("De iarnă")

Week 5: Final (22 December)

Round 1
Theme: Duets & Romanian Songs  
Group performance(s): X Factor Finalists ("Merry Christmas Everyone"), "Silent Night"
Musical Guest: Zdob și Zdub ("Bunica Bate Toba"), The Colors ("Two of Us")

Round 2
Theme: Final Duel
Musical Guest: Zdob și Zdub ("DJ Vasile")

Artists' appearances on earlier talent shows
 Oana Muntean and Alexandru Simion made it to Vocea României's The Battle rounds in season two.
 Eliza Bunu participated in season two of X Factor, but she was eliminated at Judges home.
 Alex Mațaev former Fabrica de Staruri winner is one of the contestants to compete this season.

Controversy 
One of the contestants, Paolo Laganá (an Italian living in Romania at the time of the contest), made known his homosexuality on his entrance forms, which eventually drew ire and epithets from judge Cheloo. The offending remarks were edited from the broadcast, but may have affected the outcome of the contest in which Laganá was eliminated early. The event drew outcries from the Italian LGBT community, with calls for action from the Italian Ministry of the Exterior.

After the show, Laganá left Romania and moved to Berlin, where he changed his name into FDAEJZ.

Ratings

References

X Factor (Romanian TV series)
Romania 03
2013 Romanian television seasons
Antena 1 (Romania) original programming